Jessica Boone (born May 14, 1984) is an American film, television, and voice actress with extensive experience in Shakespeare and musical theatre, who used to work primarily for ADV Films, Funimation, Sentai Filmworks, and Seraphim Digital, when she lived in Houston.

Career 
Boone has been a leading player with the Houston Shakespeare Festival, and is co-CEO and an associate artist for Prague Shakespeare Company, the Czech Republic's professional English-language theatre, where her roles have included Rosalind, Juliet, Helena, Regan, Ophelia, Innogen, and Lady Macbeth. Boone is also an accomplished voice actress, known throughout the anime world for her work voicing hundreds of characters in Japanese animated series such as Mimmy in Hello Kitty, Misaki Suzuhara in Angelic Layer, Chiyo Mihama in Azumanga Daioh, Fuki in Mushishi from Episode 19, and  Sheele in Akame ga Kill. Her film and TV work includes feature films Unlocked directed by Michael Apted, starring Michael Douglas, Orlando Bloom, Noomi Rapace, and John Malkovich  and Puerto Ricans in Paris starring Rosario Dawson, Rosie Perez, and Luis Guzman.

Boone also appeared on Disney-ABC Television Group as Rabia in Missing starring Ashley Judd, Sean Bean, and Cliff Curtis.

She currently lives in Prague, Czech Republic, and has occasionally returned to the Houston area.

Filmography

Live action
 Spectrauma (2011) – Isabelle
 Missing (2012) – Rabia
 Meet the Engineer (2012 web series for Škoda Auto) – Sophie
 Unlocked – Romley's Assistant (2016)
 Puerto Ricans in Paris – Vincent's Secretary (2015)

Anime

 Air Gear – Ine Makigami, Ishiwatari
 Akame ga Kill! - Sheele
 All Purpose Cultural Cat Girl Nuku Nuku – Chieko, Yoshimi (OVA) (Debut role)
 Angel Beats! – Hisako, Hatsune Otonashi
 Angelic Layer – Misaki Suzuhara
 Another – Izumi Akazawa
 Azumanga Daioh – Chiyo Mihama
 Best Student Council – Kotoha Kutsugi, Yuko Kimizuka
 The Book of Bantorra – Lully, Yuri
 Canaan – Liang Qi
 Le Chevalier D'Eon – Ekaterina
 Chrono Crusade – Azmaria Hendric
 Clannad After Story – Sugisaka (Ep. 13–14), Kimura (Ep. 23), Yuu's Sister (Ep. 7–8)
 Coyote Ragtime Show – October, November, December
 Cyber Team in Akihabara – Miyama Soshigaya
 D.N.Angel – Mio Hio
 Demon King Daimao – Yuri Hoshino/Yuko Hattori
 Devil Survivor 2: The Animation – Io Nitta
 Divergence Eve – Kiri Marialate
 Dusk Maiden of Amnesia – Kirie Kanoe, Yukariko Kanoe (Young, Ep. 10)
 Elfen Lied – Arakawa
 Full Metal Panic! – President's Daughter
 Full Metal Panic? Fumoffu – Mizuki Inaba
 Gantz – Masaru Kato (young), Additional Voices
 Gate - Princess Piña Co Lada
 Golgo 13 – Celia Irving (Ep. 35), Karen (Ep. 23)
 Gravion – Ena
 The Guin Saga – Queen Tonya
 Hakugei: Legend of the Moby Dick – Marie
 Hello Kitty's Animation Theater – Mimmy
 Highschool of the Dead – Rei Miyamoto
 Horizon in the Middle of Nowhere II – Thomas Shakespeare
 Innocent Venus – Sana Nobuto
 Jinki:EXTEND – Akao Hiiragi
 Kaleido Star – Julie, Sophie Oswald
 Kanon – Nayuki Minase
 Kiba – Kira
 Kurau: Phantom Memory – Christmas
 Legend of the Mistical Ninja – Yae
 Maburaho – Yuna Miyama
 Magical Shopping Arcade Abenobashi – Arumi Asahina
 Magikano – Ayumi Mamiya
 Megazone 23 Part III – Ryo
 Mezzo DSA – Kanako
 Momo: The Girl God of Death – Momo, Matsumoto's Girlfriend (Ep. 6)
 Mushishi – Fuki (Ep. 19)
 Nadesico: Prince of Darkness – Hisagon, Sayuri
 Najica Blitz Tactics – Fuyuki, Koharu
 Nanaka 6/17 – Satsuki Arashiyama
 Needless – Setsuna, Keiko
 Neo Ranga – Aya, Elina
 No Game No Life: Zero - Think Nilvalen
 Nurse Witch Komugi – Megumi Akiba
 Pani Poni Dash! – Akira Miyata
 Papuwa – Nakamura, Cocoa Queen
 PeaceMaker Kurogane – Hotaru
 The Place Promised in Our Early Days – Sayuri Sawatari
 Princess Tutu – Rue/Princess Kraehe
 Puni Puni Poemy – Mitsuki Aasu
 Red Garden – Jessica
 Rune Soldier – Gannet
 Samurai Bride – Ginsen Yagyu (credited as Circe Nightmare)
 Science Ninja Team Gatchaman – Julia (Ep. 43; ADV dub)
 Shattered Angels – Kozue Sato
 Sister Princess – Shirayuki
 Super GALS! – Rie Aihara, Minigal White, Maki Komine
 Tactics (manga) – Suzu Edogawa
 This Ugly Yet Beautiful World – Akari
 Those Who Hunt Elves – Mer-Elf, Elven Hunter #1, Pulana
 The Wallflower – Noi Kasahara
 Tokyo Magnitude 8.0 – Yamaji
 Towa no Quon – Yuriko Akatsuki
 A Tree of Palme – Popo
 UFO Ultramaiden Valkyrie – Inarba
 The World God Only Knows – Haqua
 Vinland Saga – Anne
 Xam'd Lost Memories – Kobako, Kujireika
 Xenosaga: The Animation – Mary Godwin, Shelley Godwin
 Yumeria – Kuyou Senjyou, Koneko

Video games
 Unlimited Saga – Ruby
 Dex – Dex

Other media
 Spider-Woman: Agent of S.W.O.R.D (Motion Comic) – Zhang Lee

Theatre
 Or – Lady Davenant (Main Street Theater - 2011)
 A Christmas Carol – Martha Cratchit (Alley Theatre)
 Romeo and Juliet – Juliet (Houston Shakespeare Festival - 2007)
 Cymbeline – Innogen (Houston Shakespeare Festival - 2008)
 Pericles – Thaisa (Houston Shakespeare Festival - 2009)
 A Midsummer Night's Dream – Helena (Houston Shakespeare Festival - 2010)
 King Lear – Regan (Prague Shakespeare Festival/Classical Theatre Company in Houston and Prague - 2011)
 As You Like It – Rosalind (Prague Shakespeare Festival/Krumlov Shakespeare Festival - 2011)
 As You Like It – Rosalind (Prague Shakespeare Festival/Classical Theatre Company in Houston and Prague - 2011)
 The Coast of Utopia: Salvage – Natasha (Main Street Theater - 2012)
 The Coast of Utopia: Shipwreck – Natasha (Main Street Theater - 2012)
 Richard III – Lady Anne (Prague Shakespeare Festival/Main Street Theater - April 2012 in Houston and Prague)
 Hamlet – Ophelia (Prague Shakespeare Festival - October 2012)
 Henry V – Katherine/ Boy (Prague Shakespeare Company/ Main Street Theater - 2013)
 Cymbeline – Innogen (Prague Shakespeare Company - 2013)
 Macbeth – Lady Macbeth (Prague Shakespeare Company - 2013-2014)
 Venus in Fur – Vanda (Prague Shakespeare Company - 2014)
 Into The Woods - Cinderella (Prague Shakespeare Company - 2014)
 Much Ado About Nothing - Hero (Prague Shakespeare Company - 2015)
 Twelfth Night - Viola (Prague Shakespeare Company - 2015)
 The Winter's Tale - Hermione (Prague Shakespeare Company - 2016)
 Amadeus - Constanza Weber (Prague Shakespeare Company - 2017)
 The Revolutionists - Charlotte Corday (Prague Shakespeare Company - 2017)
 An Iliad - Muse (Prague Shakespeare Company - 2018)
 Troilus and Cressida and Trojan Women - Athena (Prague Shakespeare Company - 2018)

References

External links
 
 
 
 Jessica Boone at the CrystalAcids Anime Voice Actor Database

1984 births
Living people
Actresses from Houston
American child actresses
American expatriates in the Czech Republic
American film actresses
American Shakespearean actresses
American stage actresses
American television actresses
American video game actresses
American voice actresses